Lost Friends is the debut studio album by Australian alternative-indie rock band Middle Kids. It was released in May 2018 and peaked at number 10 on the ARIA Charts.

At the J Awards of 2018, it won Australian Album of the Year.

Reception

At Metacritic, which assigns a normalized rating out of 100 to reviews from mainstream publications, the album received a weighted average score of 70 based on 11 reviews, which indicates generally favorable reviews.

Track listing

Personnel

Musicians
Middle Kids
 Hannah Joy – writing, vocals, guitar, piano 
 Tim Fitz – bass, production 
 Harry Day	– drums

Charts

Release history

References

2018 debut albums
Middle Kids albums